Cibrario is an Italian surname. Notable people with this surname include:
 (1877–1962), Italian physician and painter
Benedetta Cibrario (born 1962), Italian writer
, Italian footballer
 (1843–1917), Italian lawyer and politician, son of Luigi
Luigi, Count Cibrario (1802–1870), Italian statesman and historian, father of Giacinto
Maria Cibrario (1905–1992), Italian mathematician

Italian-language surnames